Ichihashi (written: 市橋) is a Japanese surname. Notable people with the surname include:

, Japanese long-distance runner
, Japanese rapist, murderer, and fugitive
, Japanese footballer
Yamato Ichihashi (1878-1963), Japanese-American academic
, Japanese bobsledder

Japanese-language surnames